Adams Township is a township in Walsh County, North Dakota, United States.

Townships in Walsh County, North Dakota
Townships in North Dakota